Petar Puača (born 14 April 1972) is a Serbian former professional footballer who played as a striker.

Career
After failing to receive any playing time at Partizan in the 1990–91 season, Puača moved to OFK Beograd, making his first senior appearances during the 1991–92 Yugoslav First League. He spent two more years with the Romantičari, before switching to Obilić in 1994. During the 1996 winter transfer window, Puača was transferred to Red Star Belgrade.

Following his stint with Helsingborgs IF in the 1997 Allsvenskan, Puača moved to Italy and joined Serie B club Cremonese in 1998, initially on trial. He appeared eight times and scored two goals in the second half of the 1998–99 season, as the club finished bottom of the table.

After playing for Vojvodina and Zeta in the First League of FR Yugoslavia, Puača moved to Cyprus and joined AEK Larnaca in the summer of 2001. He was released in February 2002. Before retiring from the game, Puača also briefly played for Borac Čačak and Nyíregyháza Spartacus.

Career statistics

Honours
Red Star Belgrade
 FR Yugoslavia Cup: 1995–96

References

External links
 

AEK Larnaca FC players
Allsvenskan players
Association football forwards
Cypriot First Division players
Expatriate footballers in Cyprus
Expatriate footballers in Hungary
Expatriate footballers in Italy
Expatriate footballers in Sweden
First League of Serbia and Montenegro players
FK Borac Čačak players
FK Obilić players
FK Partizan players
FK Vojvodina players
FK Zeta players
Helsingborgs IF players
Nemzeti Bajnokság II players
Nyíregyháza Spartacus FC players
OFK Beograd players
Red Star Belgrade footballers
Serbia and Montenegro expatriate footballers
Serbia and Montenegro expatriate sportspeople in Cyprus
Serbia and Montenegro expatriate sportspeople in Hungary
Serbia and Montenegro expatriate sportspeople in Italy
Serbia and Montenegro expatriate sportspeople in Sweden
Serbia and Montenegro footballers
Serbian footballers
Serie B players
Footballers from Belgrade
U.S. Cremonese players
Yugoslav First League players
Yugoslav footballers
1972 births
Living people